Detchanam literally means south or the land of south though in greater sense it includes the land south of Kailash. In Akilattirattu Ammanai the word Detchanam directly represents the land of South India with Swamithoppe as its centre, and including a vast area of land, south-east to Kanyakumari.

See also
Thuvaraiyam Pathi
List of Ayyavazhi-related articles

Ayyavazhi